Varyash (Wäräş) is a rural locality (a selo) in Novoartaulsky Selsoviet, Yanaulsky District, Bashkortostan, Russia. The population was 170 as of 2010. There are 2 streets.

Geography 
Varyash is located 20 km northwest of Yanaul (the district's administrative centre) by road. Varyashbash is the nearest rural locality.

References 

Rural localities in Yanaulsky District